Santos is a Kenyan professional football club, based in Nairobi, which currently competes in FKF Division One. It competed in the Kenyan National Super League in 2008.

The club was known as Dagoretti Green Santos.

Notable former players
Dennis Oliech

References

External links

Kenyan Premier League clubs
Kenyan National Super League clubs
FKF Division One clubs
Football clubs in Kenya